Pelican Lake is a lake located about seven miles north of Pelican Rapids, in Otter Tail County, Minnesota, United States.  Pelican Lake is now a highly developed lake with its major uses being predominantly recreation, but its fishing is also excellent.  The lake was recently discovered to be infested with zebra mussels, which threatens not only Pelican Lake, but all lakes connected by the Pelican River.

Size and shape
The lake got its name because of its unique and very intricate resemblance to the shape of a pelican.

Neighboring lakes
The Pelican River runs through the lake and forces water southeastward into Lake Lizzie. Little Pelican Lake is located to the northeast and is navigable by going upstream on the Pelican River. There is a water inflow coming from the Spring Creek that feeds from Cormorant Lake (Minnesota)

Recreation
A popular family resort by the name of Fair Hills Resort is located on the lake.

Barry's Mansion
Barry's Mansion is an estate built by businessman and philanthropist B. John Barry starting in 1998.

Notable People with Second Homes on Pelican Lake
Doug Burgum, Governor of North Dakota
Dave Hakstol, former coach for the Philadelphia Flyers
John Barry, former owner of Sun Country Airlines

References

Lakes of Otter Tail County, Minnesota
Lakes of Minnesota